Mills House is a historic home located at Fort Mill, York County, South Carolina. It was built in 1906, and is a two-story, frame dwelling in the Classical Revival style with a slate hipped roof.  The front façade features a central lower porch topped by an upper tier and flanked by side porches. All porches have Doric order columns and turned balusters.

It was added to the National Register of Historic Places in 1992.

References

Houses on the National Register of Historic Places in South Carolina
Neoclassical architecture in South Carolina
Houses completed in 1906
Houses in York County, South Carolina
National Register of Historic Places in York County, South Carolina
1906 establishments in South Carolina